Al Liby (اللّيبي‎, 'the Libyan'), or variations, is a surname, alias or nom-de-guerre used by several individuals from Libya.  Variations include al Libi, al-Libi, al-Liby and al-Libby. People with the name include:

 Abdullah Said al Libi, al Qaeda's operations planner for Pakistan, killed by a drone in 2009
 Abu Faraj al-Libbi (Mustafa Faraj Muhammad Muhammad Masud al-Jadid al-Uzaybi), alleged al Qaeda leader, held at Guantanamo
 Abu Laith al-Libi (Ali Ammar Ashur al-Rufayi,), senior figure in al Qaeda, reportedly killed in a drone strike in 2008
 Abu Yahya al-Libi (Mohamed Hassan Qaid), leading official of al Qaeda, escaped from detention in Bagram, killed by a drone in 2012
 Abu Anas al-Liby (Nazih Abdul-Hamed Nabih al-Ruqai'i), indicted for the 1998 East Africa embassy bombings, died in U.S. custody in 2015
 Ibn al-Shaykh al-Libi (Ali Mohamed Abdul Aziz al-Fakheri), who provided the source of US claims used to support the 2003 Iraq war, died by suicide in prison in 2009
 Abd al-Muhsin Al-Libi (Ibrahim Tantoush), alleged Libyan Al-Qaeda leader, indicted by the U.S.
 Salem Abdul Salem Ghereby, or Luqman al-Libi, held in Guantanamo 2002–2016
 Abdel Wahab Qaid, or Abu Idris al-Libi, Libyan politician and former militia leader
 Abu Habib al-Libi, or Abu Habib al-Libi, senior Islamic State leader in Iraq and Libya

See also

Arabic-language surnames
Nisbas
Libyan people
Toponymic surnames